John Gynwell (died 1362) was a medieval Bishop of Lincoln. He was nominated on 23 March 1347 and consecrated on 23 September 1347. He died on 5 August 1362.

Notes

Citations

References

 

Bishops of Lincoln
Archdeacons of Northampton
1362 deaths
Archdeacons of Richmond
Year of birth unknown
14th-century English Roman Catholic bishops